Guilly is the name of 2 communes in France:

 Guilly, in the Indre department
 Guilly, in the Loiret department